Patterns was a sandbox-style building game published by San Francisco-based Linden Lab, which had previously been known primarily as the creator of the online virtual world Second Life. The PC product, which was distributed via BuildPatterns.com, continues the company’s positioning as a maker of "shared creative spaces" that favor open-ended content creation and sharing over traditional goal-oriented gaming.

Gameplay
Since its debut in 2012, Patterns has drawn comparisons to games with blocks among the media and industry observers, with GameSpy’s Mike Sharkey calling the game “Minecraft, but with triangles instead of blocks.”

As with most games that include blocks, creators are encouraged to explore and build in an expansive open-space environment. Creators can construct simple or elaborate structures using various shapes and patterns that are discovered as the game progresses. Critics have noted that a distinct difference from games like Minecraft is that creations in Patterns are subject to the laws of gravity, which can impact the strength and durability of each creation.  Creators must also consider how to best strategically choose each building substance, since they contain different physical properties.

Cancellation
On October 10 2014 Linden Lab announced that they were abandoning development of Patterns and shutting down the servers. The game was subsequently pulled from sale on Steam.

References

Cancelled macOS games
Cancelled Windows games